OpenStructures is an open source modular construction model based on a shared geometrical grid, called the OS grid. It was conceived by designer Thomas Lommée, and first demonstrated at the Z33, a house for contemporary art. According to Lommee, the OpenStructures project explores the possibility of a modular system where "everyone designs for everyone." OpenStructures is developing a database where anyone can share designs which are in turn available for download by the public. Each component design in the OS system will feature previously designed OS parts that were used to create it. In addition, each part will feature component designs that can be made from it.

The OpenStructures model includes large and small scale manufacturers as well as craftsmen. They are invited to create their own designs according to the OS standard for sale on the market, which can in turn be fixed or disassembled at their end of life and made into new products.

Grid 

The OpenStructures grid is built around a square of  4 x 4 cm and is scalable.  The squares can be further subdivided or put together to form larger squares, without losing inter-compatibility. The image shows nine complete squares of each 4x4 cm put together. 

Designers use the OS grid to determine dimensions, assembly points, and interconnecting diameters. This allows parts that were not originally from the same design to be used together in a new design.

Scales
OpenStructures works at several scales, and analogies are made to biological systems including (from smallest to biggest):

 Parts, like body tissues.
 Components, like organs, formed by the functional grouping together of multiple tissues. An example is a motor.
 Structures, like a group of related organs in an organ system. Here, different components are composed with frames and joints, such as a bicycle.
 Superstructures, like organisms, can be understood as the whole hierarchical assembly of different structures that together function as a stable whole which has the capacity to grow and develop. Example are houses or electric vehicles.

Open architecture

One of the research areas of OpenStructures is architecture. Architects of the Brussels Cooperation Collective have worked on the subject.

Autarchitecture is based in OpenStructures and proposes flexible constructions that can adapt over time.

Open smart brick elements and buildings can be based on OpenStructures.

Other uses
Fab lab Academy had been building several beehives making use of the OpenStructures system to make them more sustainable.

See also
3D printing
Contraptor
Modular building
Modular construction systems
Open architecture
Open source
Open-source architecture
Smart brick
WikiHouse

References

External links
 
 
 
 
 Open Structures: Thomas Lommee at TEDxEutropolis
 
 
  at the P2P Foundation
 

Open design
Open-source hardware
Modular design
Computer-aided design